Estell is a surname. Notable people with the surname include:

Dick Estell (1926–2016), American radio personality
John Estell (1861–1928), Australian politician

See also
 Estelle (disambiguation)

English-language surnames